Muhajir festivals are various festive celebrations observed by Muhajirs in Pakistan and the diaspora Muhajir community found worldwide.

Political

MQM Founding Day 
MQM Founding Day is a political festival observed by Muhajirs to celebrate the founding of the first Muhajir nationalist party Muttahida Qaumi Movement, architect of Mohajir nation and Mohajir identity. Thousands gather at Nishtar Park and other grounds in Karachi, where MQM holds grand public meetings. This event is also celebrated in United Kingdom.

APMSO Founding Day 
APMSO Founding Day is a political festival observed to celebrate the founding of the first Muhajir nationalist student union All Pakistan Muttahidda Students Organization. It is celebrated annually in Pakistan, United Kingdom and Saudi Arabia. For celebrations a large number of APMSO activists gather on the night of June 11 at the Mukka Chowk and from there they march towards Nine Zero, carrying candles and shouting slogans.

Religious 
The Muslim festivals are set according to the lunar Islamic calendar (Hijri), and the date falls earlier by 10 to 13 days from year to year.

Eid Al Fitr 
Eid al-Fitr takes place on the first day of the tenth month of the Islamic lunar calendar and celebrates the end of Ramadan.

Eid Al Adha 
Eid ul-Adha is celebrated on the tenth day of the last Islamic month of Zil hijja. It is celebrated to commemorate the occasion when the Prophet Abraham was ready to sacrifice his son, Ismail, on God's command. Abraham was awarded by God by replacing Ismail with a goat.

Animal sacrifice is a tradition offered by Muslims on this day. Special markets are set up to deal with the increase in demand of animals in muhajir dominated areas such as Karachi and Hyderabad. Muhajir consume traditional dishes such as Bihari and seekh kebabs, Delhi's mutton dalcha, a spicy meat and chickpea curry from Hyderabad.

Ethnic/Cultural

Muhajir Culture Day 
Muhajir Cultural Day is a popular Muhajir cultural festival, celebrated with traditional enthusiasm to highlight the modern Muhajir and Urdu-speaking culture. The day is celebrated all over Karachi and amongst the Muhajir diaspora worldwide population. Rallies are held in different parts of the city, with a large number of people, mostly youngsters. A rally is always held from Karimabad to the mausoleum of Quaide Azam under the auspices of Nojawan e Muhajir.

References 

Muhajir culture